Kevin Belcher (February 23, 1961 – June 28, 2003) was an American football center who played two seasons with the New York Giants of the National Football League (NFL). He was drafted by the New York Giants in the sixth round of the 1983 NFL Draft. He played college football at the University of Texas at El Paso and attended Redford High School in Detroit, Michigan.

Professional career
Belcher was selected by the New York Giants with the 153rd pick in the 1983 NFL Draft. He played in 32 games, starring sixteen, for the Giants from 1983 to 1984. His career ended when he was involved in a car wreck on January 23, 1985, severing a nerve in his leg and leaving him with many other internal injuries.

Personal life
Belcher owned several businesses. He died at his home in El Paso, Texas on June 28, 2003.

References

External links
Just Sports Stats

1961 births
2003 deaths
Players of American football from Detroit
American football centers
American football offensive guards
African-American players of American football
UTEP Miners football players
New York Giants players
20th-century American businesspeople
African-American businesspeople
Businesspeople from Michigan
Redford High School alumni
20th-century African-American sportspeople
21st-century African-American people
Ed Block Courage Award recipients